Moran Lake is a  lake located on Vancouver Island north of the east end of Great Central Lake.

References

Alberni Valley
Lakes of Vancouver Island
Alberni Land District